Carola is a female given name, the Latinized form of the Germanic given names Caroline or Carol. 

Carola may also refer to:

Family name
Josep Pallach i Carolà (1920–1977), a Catalan socialist leader
Marco Carola (born 1975), an Italian electronic musician and DJ

Places
Carola, Missouri, an unincorporated community in the United States

Ships
Carola-class corvette, a group of six 19th century German warships
SMS Carola, the lead ship of the class, launched in 1880
USS Carola IV (SP-812), a US Navy auxiliary patrol boat, built 1885
SY Carola, a steam yacht built in 1898, now a floating museum ship at Irvine, Scotland
Carola (yacht 1930), a motor yacht, currently named Talitha

Other uses
Carola (sea vegetable), several species of edible seaweed
Coca Carola, a Swedish punk band